Dasun Senevirathna (born 31 January 1998) is a Sri Lankan cricketer. He made his first-class debut for Chilaw Marians Cricket Club in the 2017–18 Premier League Tournament on 8 December 2017. He made his Twenty20 debut for Chilaw Marians Cricket Club in the 2017–18 SLC Twenty20 Tournament on 25 February 2018.

References

External links
 

1998 births
Living people
Sri Lankan cricketers
Chilaw Marians Cricket Club cricketers
Place of birth missing (living people)